Governor's Punch Bowl is a small alpine lake in Blaine County, Idaho, United States, located in the Boulder Mountains in Sawtooth National Recreation Area. While no trails lead to the lake, it is most easily accessed from Idaho State Highway 75 near Galena Summit.

References

Lakes of Idaho
Lakes of Blaine County, Idaho
Glacial lakes of the United States
Sawtooth National Forest